Żydowo  is a village in the administrative district of Gmina Czerniejewo, within Gniezno County, Greater Poland Voivodeship, in west-central Poland.

The village has a population of 1,700.

References

Villages in Gniezno County